Aadmi is a 1968 Indian Hindi drama film produced by P. S. Veerappa and directed by A. Bhimsingh. The film stars Dilip Kumar, Waheeda Rehman, Manoj Kumar, Simi Garewal and Pran. The film's music is by Naushad. The film is a remake of the Tamil film Aalayamani. Besides being noted for Dilip Kumar's acting as a man in a wheelchair, the film is also known for its dialogues by Akhtar ul Iman and trick cinematography work by Faredoon A. Irani. It was a commercial success at the box office.

Cast
 Dilip Kumar as Rajesh / Raja Sahib
 Waheeda Rehman as Meena
 Manoj Kumar as Dr. Shekhar
 Simi Garewal as Dr. Aarti 
 Pran as Mayadas 
 Agha as Prem
 Mohan Choti as Hari
 Shivraj as Girdharilal
 Ulhas as Govind 
 Padma Chavan as Parvati 
 Sulochana Latkar as Shekhar's Mother

Music 
Lyrics : Shakeel Badayuni
Composer : Naushad

References

External links
 

Hindi remakes of Tamil films
Films set in India
1968 drama films
1960s Indian films
1960s Hindi-language films
1968 films
Films directed by A. Bhimsingh
Films scored by Naushad
Hindi-language drama films
Indian drama films